The Iranian ambassador in Abu Dhabi is the official representative of the Government in Tehran to the Government of the United Arab Emirates.

List of representatives

See also
 Iran–United Arab Emirates relations
 Embassy of Iran, Abu Dhabi

References

 
United Arab Emirates
Iran